is a Japanese radio-controlled car racer from Edogawa, Tokyo.  He has won five IFMAR World Championship titles as well as five top qualifier titles. He has also won 24 JMRCA All-Japan Championship titles. Until the end of 2014, Matsukura drove for Yokomo. At the beginning of 2015 he signed up to drive for Tamiya and Kyosho.

Biography

Matsukura  won his first national championship race at the age of 12 in 2004. At 15, was the youngest driver to win the IFMAR Worlds in 2008. In total, he has won  25 JMRCA All-Japan Championship titles including:
1 1:10 EP Touring Sportsman (opened to amateur/unsponsored racers with stock motors)
4 1:10 EP Touring Super Expert (for elite racers with modified motors)
7 1:12 EP Racing
5 1:10 EP Off-road 2WD
9 1:10 EP Off-road 4WD
1 1:8 GP Off-Road

During his tenure at Yokomo, he was mentored by Masami Hirosaka. At the end of 2014, left Yokomo after ten years with them and signed a contract with Muchmore Racing for use of its electronics, Kyosho for off-road racing and Tamiya for touring car racing.

His elder sister  also compete in radio-controlled car racing.

Complete R/C Racing summary 
Bold on results indicates top qualifier

IFMAR World Championship results

FEMCA Championship results

JMRCA All-Japan Championship results 
A non-first-place finisher highlighted in gold indicates that despite being won by an invited foreign driver, the championship is awarded to the best native driver.

Notes

References

RC car racing drivers
1993 births
Living people
People from Edogawa, Tokyo
Sportspeople from Tokyo
Radio-controlled car personalities
Yokomo
Tamiya Corporation
Kyosho